The Franklin Canal is an irrigation canal in the Upper Rio Grande Valley near El Paso, Texas. The canal acquires water from the Rio Grande via the American Canal.

The Franklin Irrigation Company completed the canal in 1891 at a cost of $150,000. In 1912, the U.S. Reclamation Service purchased the canal, and it became a key part of the Rio Grande Project.

The canal was renovated and enlarged between 1912 and 1916. The work included repairing the diversion dam, enlarging the heading of the canal, and lining a portion of the channel with concrete. When completed, the canal was capable of irrigating .

See also

National Register of Historic Places listings in El Paso County, Texas
Texas Irrigation Canals
Riverside Canal
American Canal

References

External links

Canals in Texas
Historic American Engineering Record in Texas
Irrigation canals
National Register of Historic Places in El Paso County, Texas
Transportation buildings and structures in El Paso County, Texas
United States Bureau of Reclamation
Canals opened in 1889
Canals on the National Register of Historic Places in Texas